Slovenia competed at the 2018 Winter Olympics in Pyeongchang, South Korea, from 9 to 25 February 2018. 71 athletes competed in 9 sports, including the men's national ice hockey team.

Slovenian athletes won two Olympic medals: biathlete Jakov Fak won silver in men's individual while snowboarder Žan Košir won bronze in men's parallel giant slalom, his third Olympic medal in total. The country ranked 24th in the medal table. The ice hockey team won two games in the preliminary round, against United States and Slovakia, but lost in the playoffs against Norway.

Medalists

|  style="text-align:left; width:78%; vertical-align:top;"|

Summary

In January 2018, the Olympic Committee of Slovenia officially confirmed 71 competitors who would represent the country at the Pyeongchang Winter Olympics. Slovenia men's national ice hockey team already qualified for the Olympic tournament at the qualification tournament in 2016. Vesna Fabjan, a cross-country skier and a bronze medalist from Sochi, was chosen as the flag-bearer for the opening ceremony. The selection was conducted using a Facebook poll among three candidates, Fabjan, biathlete Jakov Fak, and ice hockey player Mitja Robar. Fak later distanced himself from the poll after being targeted by hate speech in online forums, having previously represented Croatia at the 2010 Winter Olympics. In Vancouver, Fak won a bronze medal in men's sprint.

In Sochi, Slovenia won a record eight medals, including two gold by alpine skier Tina Maze. Since the 2014 Olympics, Maze retired from competitive skiing, as did the biathlete Teja Gregorin. The media expectations were lower than before the Sochi Olympics. Alpine skier Ilka Štuhec, the 2017 downhill World Champion and second in the overall 2016-17 World Cup standings, suffered an injury in autumn 2017 and had to skip the entire 2017-18 season. The strongest potential candidate for medals was Jakov Fak, who had strong World Cup  performances earlier in the season, with media noting that freestyle skier Filip Flisar, ski jumpers, or alpine skiers were also capable of achieving good results.

In alpine skiing, the best Slovenian result was a 4th place of Žan Kranjec in giant slalom, while skiers won three more top-10 finishes. In team event, Slovenian team was eliminated in the round of 16 against Sweden. The best result in women's events was an 11th place of Ana Bucik in women's combined.

In biathlon, five men and two women competed. Jakov Fak faced some problems at the first two events but won a silver medal at the men's individual event, covering all 20 targets. Among other prominent results, Fak finished 10th in mass start, Klemen Bauer 10th in individual, and Urška Poje 12th in women's individual, covering all 20 targets.

In cross-country skiing, the best results were achieved by Anamarija Lampič who finished 7th in sprint and 6th in team sprint together with Alenka Čebašek.

At the men's ice hockey tournament, Slovenia competed in Group B with United States, Slovakia, and Olympic Athletes from Russia in the preliminary round. Following the NHL's decision not to allow its players to participate at the tournament, Slovenia's top player Anže Kopitar of Los Angeles Kings was unable to join the team. In their first game, Slovenia beat the United States 3-2 in overtime, having returned from 0-2 in the last third. Goal scorers for Slovenia were Jan Urbas and Jan Muršak. In the second game, Slovenia lost 2-8 to the OAR team, with Žiga Pance and Muršak scoring for Slovenia. Slovenia won against Slovakia 3-2 after a penalty shootout. Slovenia finished 2nd in their group and faced Norway in the playoff. Norway won 2-1 in overtime and Slovenia finished 9th in the overall ranking. Just before the game against Norway, the IOC announced that Žiga Jeglič tested positive for doping. In his reaction, Jeglič stated that he had neglected to report his use of an asthma drug containing fenoterol which his doctor had prescribed for him. Jelgič was suspended from the games and had to skip the game against Norway.

In ski jumping, the best individual results were a 7th place of Nika Križnar in women's normal hill individual and an 11th place of Peter Prevc in men's large hill individual. Slovenian team finished 5th at the team event.

In snowboarding, none of the three athletes in freestyle events qualified for the finals. In parallel event (giant slalom), Žan Košir, Tim Mastnak, and Glorija Kotnik qualified to the finals. Mastnak and Kotnik were eliminated in the round of 16 while Košir won a bronze medal after defeating Sylvain Dufour of France. Košir's semifinal defeat against Lee Sang-ho of South Korea caused some controversy as the photo finish clearly showed Košir crossing the finish line well ahead of Lee. Later, FIS officials explained that the time was measured correctly and that the photo finish footage is irrelevant. Ultimately, Košir stated that he was happy with the medal he won, having skipped the previous two seasons due to back injuries.

Among other events, Tilen Sirše finished 39th in luge, the best Slovenian result in Nordic combined was a 28th place of Vid Vrhovnik in normal hill/10 km, and Filip Flisar finished 7th in men's ski cross. Flisar was the flagbearer for Slovenia at the closing ceremony.

Competitors
The following is the list of number of competitors participating at the Games per sport/discipline.

Alpine skiing 

Men

Women

Mixed

Source:

Biathlon 

Based on their Nations Cup ranking in the 2016–17 Biathlon World Cup, Slovenia has qualified 5 men and 2 women.

Men

Women

Mixed

Source:

Cross-country skiing 

Distance

Sprint

Source:

Freestyle skiing 

Ski cross

Qualification legend: FA – Qualify to medal round; FB – Qualify to consolation round
Source:

Ice hockey 

Summary

Men's tournament

Slovenia men's national ice hockey team qualified by winning the final qualification tournament in Minsk, Belarus.

Team roster

Preliminary round

Qualification playoffs

Luge 

Based on the results from the World Cups during the 2017–18 Luge World Cup season, Slovenia qualified 2 sleds, but rejected one quota.

Source:

Nordic combined 

Source:

Ski jumping 

Slovenia qualified nine quota places in ski jumping.

Men

Women

Source:

Snowboarding 

Freestyle

Parallel

Source:

References

Nations at the 2018 Winter Olympics
2018
Winter Olympics